Nicholas C. Burbules is a Gutgsell Endowed Professor of Education Policy, Organization and Leadership and an affiliate of the Unit for Criticism and Interpretative Theory at the University of Illinois at Urbana-Champaign.  He is the director of the Ubiquitous Learning Institute and has served as Editor of the journal Educational Theory since 1991.

Education
Nicholas Burbules earned a Bachelor of Arts degree in Religious Studies from Grinnell College in 1975, a Master of Arts degree in Philosophy from Stanford University in 1979, and a Doctor of Philosophy degree in Philosophy of Education from Stanford University in 1983.

Work
Nicholas Burbules has been a professor in the Department of Education Policy, Organization and Leadership since 1989 at the University of Illinois at Urbana-Champaign. Prior to his work at the University of Illinois, Burbules was a professor in the Department of Educational Studies at the University of Utah.

Nicholas Burbules served as Editor of Educational Theory for more than twenty years, from 1992-2013, helped establish Education Review in 1998, and served as President of the Philosophy of Education Society in 2001.  Burbules's publications include six books, eight edited books, and over 130 journal articles or book chapters on topics including dialogue, ethics, technology, educational research, critical theory, educational psychology, social philosophy, and political philosophy. He has been an invited to speak in over ten countries on the topic of technology in education.

Nicholas Burbules' most recent work centers on Ubiquitous Learning, a concept that draws out the emergence of "any time, anywhere" learning potential made possible by increased use of handheld and portable devices, along with pervasive wireless networking. This involves a shift in ubiquity, as the traditional divide between formal and informal contexts of learning breaks down. Technological as well as social, cultural, and institutional changes mean that learning is a continuous possibility across spatial and temporal barriers. Learners of all ages expect, and often need, structured learning opportunities in a "just in time" mode; this puts new meaning and vitality into the traditional idea of "lifelong learning."

Burbules opposes the unionization of tenure track faculty at the University of Illinois at Urbana-Champaign, and is a contributing author at the blog “No Faculty Union at Illinois.”

In an August 2014 op-ed piece, Burbules and Joyce Tolliver expressed opposition toward critics of the University of Illinois's decision not to fulfill its commitment to hire Dr. Steven Salaita, a scholar known to be sympathetic to Palestinians and critical of the Israeli government. Burbules and Tolliver contended that critics of the decision did not wait until all information about the case was available. Now, with more facts about the situation, Burbules and Tolliver argued that there are two central questions to be considered. First is whether Salaita's comments, deemed "strident and vulgar" by the Illinois branch of the American Association of University Professors (AAUP), were protected by academic freedom, a position affirmatively taken by the Illinois AAUP. Second is whether the University has a right not to hire someone who writes publicly in a way that is, according to Tolliver and Burbules, "in the view of many people, incendiary and anti-Semitic." The Illinois chapter of the American Association of University Professors responded by critiquing the Burbules and Tolliver op-ed and defending Salaita's right to the University of Illinois job on grounds of academic freedom.

Honors and awards
Appointed to Gutgsell Professorship, University of Illinois (2009–2014). 
Recipient, James and Helen Merritt Foundation Award for Outstanding Contributions to the Philosophy of Education (2004).
Appointed to Grayce Wicall Gauthier Professorship, College of Education, University of Illinois (2002–2007).
President, Philosophy of Education Society (2001).

Bibliography 
Books:
Michael A Peters, Nicholas C. Burbules, and Paul Smeyers, Showing and Doing: Wittgenstein as a Pedagogical Philosopher (Boulder, Colorado: Paradigm Publishing, 2008). Revised and reissued with a new Preface and Postscript (2010).
Michael Peters and Nicholas C. Burbules, Poststructuralism and Educational Research (Lanham, Mass.: Rowman and Littlefield Publishers, 2003). Selected for the American Educational Studies Association “Critics’ Choice” Award, 2005. Translated into Chinese (2007).
Gert Biesta and Nicholas C. Burbules, Pragmatism and Educational Research (Lanham, Mass.: Rowman and Littlefield Publishers, 2003). Selected as “The John Dewey Society Book of the Year, 2004.”
Nicholas C. Burbules and Thomas A. Callister Jr., Watch IT: The Promises and Risks of Information Technologies for Education (Boulder, Colorado: Westview Press, 2000). Selected by Netsurfer Education as a “Netsurfer Recommendation,” Vol. 2 No. 7 (2000). Translated and republished as Educacion: Riesgos y Promesas de las Nuevas Tecnologias de la Informacion (Granica: Buenos Aires, Argentina, 2001).
D.C. Phillips and Nicholas C. Burbules, Postpositivism and Educational Research (Lanham, Mass.: Rowman and Littlefield Publishers, 2000).
Nicholas C. Burbules, Dialogue in Teaching: Theory and Practice (New York: Teachers College Press, 1993). Selected for the American Educational Studies Association “Critics’ Choice” Award, 1993. Selected for an invited book signing by the Conference on Intergroup Dialogue, University of Michigan, 1997. Translated and published as El Dialogo en la Ensenanza: Teoria y Practica (Amorrortu Editores: Buenos Aires, Argentina, 1999).

References

External links 
 Faculty Page
 Educational Theory

Philosophers of education
Critical theorists
Living people
Year of birth missing (living people)